Cauchois could refer to:

 Yvette Cauchois, 1908–1999, French physicist
 Cauchois dialect, a Norman dialect